Leutenbach may refer to two municipalities in Germany:

Leutenbach, Baden-Württemberg
Leutenbach, Bavaria